William Bowie may refer to:
Captain William Bowie (1721–?), early colonist in the Province of Maryland, American Revolutionary, member of the Assembly of Freemen and a delegate to the Annapolis Convention
William Bowie (agrarian) (1776–1826), American agrarian and delegate to the Maryland state convention to charter the Chesapeake & Ohio Canal
William Bowie (engineer) (1872–1940), American geodetic engineer
William Bowie (footballer) (1869–1934), Scottish footballer
William Duckett Bowie (1803–1873), American politician from Maryland
William Bowie (sculptor) (1926–1994), American sculpture artist
William Bowie (merchant) (1762–1819), merchant of Halifax, Nova Scotia killed in a duel

See also